Kasch is a surname. Notable people with the surname include:

Andrew Kasch, American film director and editor
Cody Kasch (born 1987), American actor
Friedrich Kasch (1921–2017), mathematician, named for Kasch ring
Max Kasch (born 1985), American actor